The Cabinet of Iceland is the collective decision-making body of the government of Iceland, composed of the Prime Minister and the cabinet ministers.

History
The Cabinet of Iceland is considered to have been formed 1 February 1904 when home rule was expanded in Iceland and Hannes Hafstein became the first Icelander to hold the position of Minister for Iceland in the Cabinet of Denmark (Cabinet of Deuntzer). A constitutional amendment, confirmed on 3 October 1903, stated that the Minister for Iceland had to be a resident of Reykjavík and be able to read and write Icelandic. The Minister for Iceland therefore belonged to both the Danish Cabinet and the newly created Icelandic Cabinet but was only answerable to the Icelandic Parliament. Executive power was thus transferred to Iceland with the creation of the Icelandic Cabinet (the executive branch of the government). In the beginning, there were no cabinet ministers nor ministries (aside from the Minister for Iceland) that formed the Cabinet but instead the Cabinet was divided into three offices. The offices were called first, second and third office. The first office was responsible for court, school and church affairs, the second for employment, transport and postal affairs and the third for finance. The Minister for Iceland was the most supreme officeholder in the Cabinet, but each office was headed by an Office Manager and a National Secretary supervised the three managers. The position of Minister for Iceland in the Danish and Icelandic cabinet was discontinued 30 November 1918 as the Danish–Icelandic Act of Union was signed 1 December 1918 by Denmark and Iceland. The agreement made Iceland a sovereign state – the Kingdom of Iceland – joined with Denmark in a personal union with the Danish king as the head of state of both kingdoms. The Minister for Iceland at the time of the signing of the agreement, Jón Magnússon, became the first Prime Minister of Iceland.

Current cabinet

The current cabinet (in office since 28 November 2021), consists of the following ministers:

See also
List of cabinets of Iceland

References

External links
Official website 
Official website 

 
Government of Iceland
Iceland